Alpha is the second studio album by British rock supergroup Asia, released on 26 July 1983 in the United States and on 12 August 1983 in the United Kingdom by Geffen Records. It was recorded at Le Studio in Morin-Heights, Quebec, and Manta Sound in Toronto from February to May 1983. Alpha adopted a notably more polished sound with radio-friendly elements and less emphasis on progressive rock sections. Like its multi-platinum predecessor, the album was produced by Mike Stone. It was also the last album to feature the band's original line-up for twenty-five years until Phoenix, which was released in 2008. 

The cover artwork was designed by Roger Dean, known for his work with Yes, of which Howe and keyboard player Geoff Downes had previously been members.

Production 
After Asia wrapped up their world tour for the debut album, they opted to move to Le Studio to record the followup. Inner band conflict ensued, particularly between John Wetton and Steve Howe over who was more responsible for the band's initial success. Howe recalled in All My Yesterdays, his 2021 autobiography, that in hindsight the sessions were too rushed; Geffen was eager to capitalise on the group's success and wanted to get a second album out as soon as it could. The band and the music would have, in Howe's opinion, benefited from taking a more deliberate approach. The band's mood was also complicated by the cabin fever that resulted in being in an isolated area of Quebec over the winter.

Record label executives requested Wetton and Downes write all the songs, since the hit singles from the band's first album had been their compositions. Howe thus had very little to do in terms of writing. His only song credit, "Lying to Yourself", was released as a B-side. It had originally been "Barren Land", a song about the mistreatment of Native Americans, but John Kalodner persuaded Howe to change it out of fears it would be "too controversial".

The song "Don't Cry" was written and added at the last minute, as the band felt the album lacked a strong opener. Howe recalls that as it became complete and the band listened to it, they were disappointed by how commercial it sounded. Due to the tensions within the group, producer Mike Stone was put in charge of mixing the album, where technical glitches delayed its release by several months. The band was unhappy with his final mix, with Howe describing it as a "wall of sound". They demanded a remix, which was done but did not alleviate their concerns much. There was no time for further remixes as the album's release date had been set for early August 1983 and concert dates had been scheduled.

A music video was shot for "Don't Cry", reportedly costing over $100,000 to film due to the elaborate set designs involved in it.

Commercial performance 
The album reached number 6 on the Billboard 200 chart and has been certified platinum for over 1 million copies sold in the United States. In the United Kingdom, the album peaked at number 5 and has been awarded a silver certification for over 60,000 copies sold. Despite this, it failed to meet the expectations of the record company executives, who wanted it to match the sales of the debut album.

Alpha spawned two singles. The lead-off single, "Don't Cry", reached number 10 on the Billboard Hot 100 and climbed to the top of the Mainstream Rock chart. It was the sole Top 40 entry for Asia in the United Kingdom, peaking at number 33. The B-side of the single, "Daylight", was featured as a bonus track on album original cassette editions. The second single, "The Smile Has Left Your Eyes", reached number 34 on the Billboard Hot 100 and number 25 on the Mainstream Rock charts and was the group's last major hit. Along with the singles, "The Heat Goes On" and "True Colors" were quite popular on mainstream rock radio stations.

Critical reception
The album has received lukewarm reviews from music critics. J. D. Considine in his review for Rolling Stone described Alpha as "a sort of sonic confection, a concoction of tasty melodies, sweet harmonies and goopy lyrics intended more for greedy consumption than for artistic appreciation". Chas de Whalley of Kerrang! was less than restrained and openly said that "this album is complete and utter rubbish from beginning to end and a waste of the good vinyl it's pressed on". Tom Demalon has given the album a retrospective rating of three stars out of five on AllMusic. "Don't Cry", "My Own Time (I'll Do What I Want)" and "Open Your Eyes" have been selected as three "Track Picks". He has compared the album with Asia and has summarized that "nothing on Alpha packs the sheer sonic force of the band's debut".

Re-releases 
Alpha has been re-issued numerous times, particularly in Japan. Platinum SHM-CD with a DSD flat transfer from original master tapes was released by Universal Music in 2014 and included "Daylight" and "Lying to Yourself" as bonus tracks. In 2017, the album was released on Audio Fidelity hybrid SACD remastered by Kevin Gray.

Track listing

Personnel

Asia
 Geoff Downes – keyboards
 Steve Howe – guitars
 Carl Palmer – drums
 John Wetton – vocals, bass guitars

Technical personnel
 Mike Stone – production, engineering, recording, mixing
 Paul Northfield – engineering, recording, mixing
 Rob Whelan, Frank Opolko – assistants
 Roger Dean – cover design

Charts

Certifications

References

1983 albums
Asia (band) albums
Geffen Records albums
Albums produced by Mike Stone (record producer)
Albums recorded at Le Studio
Albums with cover art by Roger Dean (artist)
Pop rock albums by English artists
Progressive rock albums by English artists